The 1972–73 CHL season was the tenth season of the Central Hockey League, a North American minor professional league. Four teams participated in the regular season, and the Omaha Knights won the league title. The league played an inter-locking schedule with the Western Hockey League.

Regular season

Playoffs

External links
 Statistics on hockeydb.com

CPHL
Central Professional Hockey League seasons